Dominique Jameux (24 December 1939 – 2 July 2015) was a French musicologist, radio producer and writer.

Biography 
He later joined France Musique, where he became a producer. He hosted Le Matin des musiciens between 1978 and 1991, as well as programs such as Le Fauteuil de Monsieur Dimanche and Histoires de musique.

Dominique Jameux founded and directed the magazine Musique en jeu, devoted to music of the twentieth century, which appeared every quarter between 1970 and 1978. He dedicated works to Richard Strauss and Alban Berg, which appeared in the series Solfèges of the Éditions du Seuil. In 1984, Fayard published his biography of Pierre Boulez. In 2009, he evoked his professional activity in Radio.

Awards 
The  (SCAM) prize was awarded to Dominique Jameux in 1994 for the whole of his radio work. In 2006, he was made a Chevalier of the Ordre du Mérite.

Publications 
1971: Richard Strauss, Le Seuil, series Solfèges
1980: Berg, Le Seuil, series Solfèges, 
1984: Pierre Boulez, Fayard, series Musiciens d'aujourd'hui, 
1986: Richard Strauss, Hachette, series Pluriel, 
1996: Fausto Coppi, L'Echappée belle, Italie 1945 - 1960, Arte Editions, reissued by Denoël, 2003 
2002: L'École de Vienne, Fayard, 
2009: Radio, Fayard, 
2012: Opéra Eros et le pouvoir, Fayard, 
2014: Chopin ou la fureur de soi, Buchet/Chastel,

References

External links 
 Hommage à Dominique Jameux on France Musique
 Dominique Jameux on France Musique
 Hommage : Dominique Jameux, l’affranchi on France Musique
 Disparition de Dominique Jameux, voix mythique de France Musique
 Hommage à Dominique Jameux : six émissions d'archive à la réécoute on France Musique
 Publications de Dominique Jameux on CAIRN

People from Vichy
1939 births
2015 deaths
20th-century French musicologists
21st-century French musicologists
French music critics
Music historians
21st-century French writers
French radio producers
Knights of the Ordre national du Mérite